TV show launched on 27 November 2000, called من سيربح المليون (Who Will Win The One Million) was broadcast on MBC1 (English translation: Who will win the million?, transliteration: Man sa yarbah al-malyoon). Its host was George Kurdahi. The biggest prize was SRls 1 million. It was aired until May 2004 and was replaced by من سيربح 2 مليون with SRls 2,000,000 top prize. On 12 January 2010 it returned with the 12-question format and the grand prize also decreased to SRls1 million. On 16 October 2015, the show returned again to 15-question format and the biggest prize also increased again to SRls 2 million.

Game's prizes

Maghreb 
من سيربح المليون (English translation: Who will win a million?, transliteration: Man sa yarbah al malyoon) is a game show broadcast in Algeria, Tunisia and Morocco based on the original British format of Who Wants to Be a Millionaire?. The show is hosted by Rachid El Ouali. The main goal of the game will be to win €500,000 by answering multiple-choice questions correctly. من سيربح المليون was broadcast from August 2009 to September 2010. It was shown on TV station Nessma TV.

The game's prizes

Winners 
There are 6 top prize winners (one was a pair).
 Khaled al Mulla - 21 November 2001
 Mohammad Tanirah - 15 March 2002
 Sidi Ahmed Weld Ali - 2 January 2003
 Kenaan Matar - 15 May 2007
 Mohammad Hamzeh - 23 March 2010
 Nasser Al Qasabi and Somaya El Khashab - 18 September 2021

Notes

References

Who Wants to Be a Millionaire?
Television game shows
2000s game shows
2010s game shows